277 Park Avenue is an office building in the Midtown Manhattan neighborhood of New York City. It is tied with two other buildings, 55 Water Street and 5 Beekman Street, as the 73rd tallest building in New York. The building is assigned its own ZIP Code, 10172; it was one of 41 buildings in Manhattan that had their own ZIP Codes .

The building currently houses parts of JPMorgan Chase's Investment Bank, Commercial Bank, and other corporate functions. JP Morgan's takeover of Bear Stearns in 2008 resulted in most investment banking employees moving to 383 Madison Avenue to reduce the leased real estate footprint in Midtown. 277 Park Avenue remains under the ownership of the family-owned Stahl Organization, the building's original developer. Previous tenants have included Penthouse Magazine, Schlumberger, Donaldson, Lufkin & Jenrette, and Chemical Bank (predecessor to JPMorgan Chase).

The office building opened on July 13, 1964. An apartment building designed by McKim, Mead, and White previously occupied the site. One tenant of that building was the presidential campaign of John F. Kennedy. Prior to the construction of the McKim, Mead and White building, the block was among the landholdings of Elizabeth Goelet Kip and her son George Goelet Kip. In the 1870s, as part of the expansion of nearby Grand Central Depot, the land was subject to a protracted legal battle which resulted in Elizabeth Kip being forced by eminent domain to sell the land to the New York and Harlem Railroad for $212,500.

Tenants
Academy Securities
Australia and New Zealand Banking Group
Bregal Investments
Bregal Partners
Bregal Sagemount
Cassidy Turley
CCMP Capital
Cozen O’Connor
The Hartford
JPMorgan Chase
Sumitomo Mitsui Banking Corporation
Continental Grain Company
MHP Real Estate Services
Agricultural Bank of China
Bank of India, US Operations
Raymond James & Associates
Ladenburg Thalmann & Co. Inc.

See also

List of tallest buildings in New York City

References

1964 establishments in New York City
Emery Roth buildings
JPMorgan Chase buildings
Midtown Manhattan
Office buildings completed in 1964
Park Avenue
Skyscraper office buildings in Manhattan